The following is a list of the 61 municipalities (comuni) of the Province of Foggia, Apulia, Italy.

List

See also
List of municipalities of Italy

References

Foggia